Asperitas is a genus of air-breathing land snails, terrestrial pulmonate gastropod mollusks in the family Dyakiidae.

Species 
The genus Asperitas include: 

(verify species/subspecies taxonomic rank)
 Asperitas abbasi (Thach, 2016)
 Asperitas abbasi Thach, 2018 (taxon inquirendum) (secondary homonym of Asperitas abbasi (Thach, 2016), junior synonym of Asperitas trochus (O. F. Müller, 1774))
 Asperitas badjavensis Rensch, 1930 
 Asperitas bimaensis (Mousson, 1849) - photo Asperitas bimaensis (Schepman, 1892)
 Asperitas bimaensis abbasianus Parsons, 2019
 Asperitas bimaensis bimaensis (Mousson, 1849)
 Asperitas bimaensis cochlostyloides (Schepman, 1892)
 Asperitas bimaensis halata (Mousson, 1849): junior synonym of Asperitas trochus (O. F. Müller, 1774) 
 Asperitas bimaensis johnabbasi Thach, 2020
 Asperitas bimaensis liei Thach, 2018: junior synonym of Asperitas trochus (O. F. Müller, 1774)
 Asperitas bimaensis soembaensis (Schepman, 1892)
 Asperitas bimaensis subpolita (E.A. Smith, 1897)
 Asperitas bimaensis viridis (Schepman, 1892)
 Asperitas coffea (L. Pfeiffer, 1855)
 Asperitas colorata (Mousson, 1849)
 Asperitas colorata komodoensis Haltenorth & Jaeckel, 1940 - Komodo asperitas snail
 Asperitas everetti E. A. Smith, 1897
 Asperitas everetti notabilis (Rensch, 1930)
 Asperitas inquinata (von dem Busch, 1842)
 Asperitas inquinata moussoni (Pfeiffer, 1849)
 Asperitas inquinata penidae (von dem Busch, 1842)
 Asperitas nemorensis Müller, 1774
 Asperitas notabilis (Rensch, 1930)
 Asperitas polymorpha E. A. Smith, 1884
 Asperitas rookmaakeri (B. Rensch, 1930)
 Asperitas rugosissima (Moellendorff, 1903) - the type species
 Asperitas serpentina B. Rensch, 1934
 Asperitas sparsa Mousson, 1854
 Asperitas sparsa baliensis Mousson, 1857
 Asperitas trochus Müller, 1774 - trochoid asperitas snail
 Asperitas trochus melanoraphe Asperitas trochus parvinsularis Asperitas trochus penidae Rensch, 1839
 Asperitas trochus polymorpha Asperitas trochus pseudonemorensis Asperitas trochus rareguttata Asperitas trochus trochus Asperitas waandersiana (Mousson, 1857) / Asperitas trochus waandersiana Mousson, 1857 - 
Species brought into synonymy
 Asperitas cidaris (Lamarck, 1822): synonym of Asperitas trochus (O. F. Müller, 1774) (junior synonym)
 Asperitas rareguttata Mousson, 1849: synonym of Asperitas trochus (O. F. Müller, 1774) (junior synonym)
 Asperitas rareguttata crebiguttata / Asperitas crebiguttata Von Martens, 1867
 Asperitas stuartiae (Sowerby in Pfeiffer, 1845): synonym of Asperitas trochus (O. F. Müller, 1774) (junior synonym)
 Asperitas stuartiae hadiprajitnoi Dharma, 1999: synonym of Asperitas trochus (O. F. Müller, 1774) (junior synonym)
 Asperitas stuartiae yani Dharma, 1999: synonym of Asperitas trochus'' (O. F. Müller, 1774) (junior synonym)

photo

References

Dyakiidae
Taxa named by John Edward Gray